Darko Bulatović (born 5 September 1989) is a Montenegrin professional footballer who plays as a left-back for Albanian club KF Vllaznia Shkodër.

Club career

Early career
Born in Nikšić, Yugoslavia, Bulatović first began playing football with hometown club Sutjeska Nikšić, although he also played briefly for OFK Beograd's youth team before returning to Sutjeska and making his senior debut with them.

Radnički Niš
On 5 August 2014, Bulatović signed a one-year contract with Serbian club Radnički Niš. He ended up playing two season for Radnički Niš under coach Milan Rastavac. During his second season with the team, Bulatović played a total of 33 games and scored a goal, after which Radnički Niš finished in fifth place in the 2015–16 Serbian SuperLiga. After the 2015–16 season, Bulatović received offers from other clubs, including Sutjeska.

Čukarički
On 29 July 2016, Bulatović signed a two-year contract with Serbian club Čukarički, and was joined by fellow teammate Marko Tomić who also joined Čukarički from Radnički Niš that summer.

Voždovac
Bulatović joined Serbian club Voždovac during the 2017–18 winter transfer window. However, he played only one season there.

Return to Sutjeska
On 16 June 2018, Bulatović returned to Sutjeska. On 23 September 2018, Bulatović scored a goal in a 2-1 win against Budućnost in the Montenegrin Derby. In his first season back at Sutjeska under coach Nikola Rakojević, the team finished in first place in the Montenegrin First League at the end of the 2018–19 season.

International career
Before a friendly match between Montenegro and Turkey on 29 May 2016, Bulatović was initially named in Montenegro's provisional squad by coach Ljubiša Tumbaković. On 6 October 2019, Bulatović was called up to the Montenegrin national team by coach Faruk Hadžibegić for two UEFA Euro 2020 qualifying matches against Bulgaria and Kosovo. On 14 October 2019, he made his debut for the Montenegrin national team in a Euro 2020 qualifier against Kosovo, which Montenegro lost 2-0.

References

External links
 
 
 Darko Bulatović stats at utakmica.rs
 

1989 births
Living people
Footballers from Nikšić
Association football defenders
Montenegrin footballers
Montenegrin expatriate footballers
Montenegro international footballers
Montenegro under-21 international footballers
FK Sutjeska Nikšić players
FK Čelik Nikšić players
Miedź Legnica players
FK Radnički Niš players
FK Čukarički players
FK Voždovac players
Knattspyrnufélag Akureyrar players
KF Vllaznia Shkodër players
Czarni Żagań players
Serbian SuperLiga players
Montenegrin First League players
Montenegrin expatriate sportspeople in Poland
Montenegrin expatriate sportspeople in Serbia
Montenegrin expatriate sportspeople in Albania
Expatriate footballers in Poland
Expatriate footballers in Iceland
Expatriate footballers in Serbia
Expatriate footballers in Albania